The list of ship decommissionings in 1997 includes a chronological list of all ships decommissioned in 1997.


See also 

1997
 Ship decommissionings
Ship